Anrep may refer to:

Anrep family of Sweden and Russia
Joseph Carl von Anrep (1796–1860)
Boris Anrep (1883–1969), Russian artist
Gabriel Anrep (1821–1907), Swedish genealogist and author
Anrep effect